Ganendra Narayan Ray (born 1 May 1933) is a Bengali Indian jurist, who served as the chief justice of the Gujarat High Court.

Early life and education
He was educated at the Presidency College, the Scottish Church College and the Department of Law, University of Calcutta at the University of Calcutta.

Career
Between 1990 and 1991, he had served as the chief justice of the Gujarat High Court. Between 1991 till his retirement in 1998, he served as a judge in the Supreme Court of India. He currently resides at Saltlake, Kolkata.

References

1933 births
20th-century Indian judges
Chief Justices of the Gujarat High Court
Justices of the Supreme Court of India
Scottish Church College alumni
University of Calcutta alumni
Living people